Carbon dioxide hydrate or carbon dioxide clathrate is a snow-like crystalline substance composed of water ice and carbon dioxide. It normally is a Type I gas clathrate. There has also been some experimental evidence for the development of a metastable Type II phase at a temperature near the ice melting point. The clathrate can exist below 283K (10 °C) at a range of pressures of carbon dioxide. CO2 hydrates are widely studied around the world due to their promising prospects of carbon dioxide capture from flue gas and fuel gas streams relevant to post-combustion and pre-combustion capture. It is also quite likely to be important on Mars due to the presence of carbon dioxide and ice at low temperatures.

History 
The first evidence for the existence of CO2 hydrates dates back to the year 1882, when Zygmunt Florenty Wróblewski reported clathrate formation while studying carbonic acid. He noted that gas hydrate was a white material resembling snow and could be formed by raising the pressure above a certain limit in his H2O - CO2 system. He was the first to estimate the CO2 hydrate composition, finding it to be approximately CO2•8H2O. He also mentions that "...the hydrate is only formed either on the walls of the tube, where the water layer is extremely thin or on the free water surface... (from French)" This already indicates the importance of the surface available for reaction (i.e. the larger the surface the better). Later on, in 1894, M. P. Villard deduced the hydrate composition as CO2•6H2O. Three years later, he published the hydrate dissociation curve in the range 267 K to 283 K (-6 to 10°C). Tamman & Krige measured the hydrate decomposition curve from 253 K down to 230 K in 1925 and Frost & Deaton (1946) determined the dissociation pressure between 273 and 283 K (0 and 10°C). Takenouchi & Kennedy (1965) measured the decomposition curve from 45 bars up to 2 kbar (4.5 to 200 MPa). The CO2 hydrate was classified as a Type I clathrate for the first time by von Stackelberg & Muller (1954).

Importance

Earth

On Earth, CO2 hydrate is mostly of academic interest. Tim Collett of the United States Geological Survey (USGS) proposed pumping carbon dioxide into subsurface methane clathrates, thereby releasing the methane and storing the carbon dioxide. As of 2009, ConocoPhillips is working on a trial on the Alaska North Slope with the US Department of Energy to release methane in this way. At first glance, it seems that the thermodynamic conditions there favor the existence of hydrates, yet given that the pressure is created by sea water rather than by CO2, the hydrate will decompose. Recently, Professor Praveen Linga and his group in collaboration with ExxonMobil have demonstrated the first-ever experimental evidence of the stability of carbon dioxide hydrate in deep-oceanic sediments.

Mars
However, it is believed that CO2 clathrate might be of significant importance for planetology. CO2 is an abundant volatile on Mars. It dominates in the atmosphere and covers its polar ice caps much of the time. In the early seventies, the possible existence of CO2 hydrates on Mars was proposed. Recent consideration of the temperature and pressure of the regolith and of the thermally insulating properties of dry ice and CO2 clathrate suggested that dry ice, CO2 clathrate, liquid CO2, and carbonated groundwater are common phases, even at Martian temperatures.

If CO2 hydrates are present in the Martian polar caps, as some authors suggest, then the polar cap can potentially melt at depth. Melting of the polar cap would not be possible if it was composed entirely of pure water ice (Mellon et al. 1996). This is because of the clathrate’s lower thermal conductivity, higher stability under pressure, and higher strength, as compared to pure water ice.

The question of a possible diurnal and annual CO2 hydrate cycle on Mars remains, since the large temperature amplitudes observed there cause exiting and reentering the clathrate stability field on a daily and seasonal basis. The question is, then, can gas hydrate being deposited on the surface be detected by any means? The OMEGA spectrometer on board Mars Express returned some data, which were used by the OMEGA team to produce CO2 and H2O-based images of the South polar cap. No definitive answer has been rendered with respect to Martian CO2 clathrate formation.

The decomposition of CO2 hydrate is believed to play a significant role in the terraforming processes on Mars, and many of the observed surface features are partly attributed to it. For instance, Musselwhite et al. (2001) argued that the Martian gullies had been formed not by liquid water but by liquid CO2, since the present Martian climate does not allow liquid water existence on the surface in general. This is especially true in the southern hemisphere, where most of the gully structures occur. However, water can be present there as ice Ih, CO2 hydrates or hydrates of other gases. All these can be melted under certain conditions and result in gully formation. There might also be liquid water at depths >2 km under the surface (see geotherms in the phase diagram). It is believed that the melting of ground-ice by high heat fluxes formed the Martian chaotic terrains. Milton (1974) suggested the decomposition of CO2 clathrate caused rapid water outflows and formation of chaotic terrains. Cabrol et al. (1998) proposed that the physical environment and the morphology of the south polar domes on Mars suggest possible cryovolcanism. The surveyed region consisted of 1.5 km-thick-layered deposits covered seasonally by CO2 frost underlain by H2O ice and CO2 hydrate at depths > 10 m. When the pressure and the temperature are raised above the stability limit, clathrate is decomposed into ice and gases, resulting in explosive eruptions.

Still a lot more examples of the possible importance of the CO2 hydrate on Mars can be given. One thing remains unclear: is it really possible to form hydrate there? Kieffer (2000) suggests no significant amount of clathrates could exist near the surface of Mars. Stewart & Nimmo (2002) find it is extremely unlikely that CO2 clathrate is present in the Martian regolith in quantities that would affect surface modification processes. They argue that long term storage of CO2 hydrate in the crust, hypothetically formed in an ancient warmer climate, is limited by the removal rates in the present climate. Baker et al. 1991 suggests that, if not today, at least in the early Martian geologic history the clathrates may have played an important role for the climate changes there. Since not too much is known about the CO2 hydrates formation and decomposition kinetics, or their physical and structural properties, it becomes clear that all the above-mentioned speculations rest on extremely unstable bases.

Moons
On Enceladus decomposition of carbon dioxide clathrate is a possible way to explain the formation of gas plumes.

In Europa (moon), clathrate should be important for storing carbon dioxide. In the conditions of the subsurface ocean in Europa, carbon dioxide clathrate should sink, and therefore not be apparent at the surface.

Phase diagram 

The hydrate structures are stable at different pressure-temperature conditions depending on the guest molecule. Here is given one Mars-related phase diagram of CO2 hydrate, combined with those of pure CO2 and water. CO2 hydrate has two quadruple points: (I-Lw-H-V) (T = 273.1 K; p = 12.56 bar or 1.256 MPa) and (Lw-H-V-LHC) (T = 283.0 K; p = 44.99 bar or 4.499 MPa). CO2 itself has a triple point at T = 216.58 K and p = 5.185 bar (518.5 kPa) and a critical point at T = 304.2 K and p = 73.858 bar (7.3858 MPa). The dark gray region (V-I-H) represents the conditions at which CO2 hydrate is stable together with gaseous CO2 and water ice (below 273.15 K). On the horizontal axes the temperature is given in kelvins and degrees Celsius (bottom and top respectively). On the vertical ones are given the pressure (left) and the estimated depth in the Martian regolith (right). The horizontal dashed line at zero depth represents the average Martian surface conditions. The two bent dashed lines show two theoretical Martian geotherms after Stewart & Nimmo (2002) at 30° and 70° latitude.

References

Clathrate hydrates
Natural gas
Industrial gases